The Poet is the fifth novel by American author Michael Connelly.  Published in 1996, it is the first of Connelly's novels not to feature Detective Harry Bosch and first to feature Crime Reporter Jack McEvoy. A sequel, The Narrows, was published in 2004. The Poet won the 1997 Dilys Award.

The story is told in first-person narrative from the perspective of reporter Jack McEvoy.  At times, a first-person narrative is also used for a mysterious character named "Eidolon".  And, while telling the story from the viewpoint of pedophile William Gladden, Connelly uses third-person narrative. The book also features the first appearance of FBI agent Rachel Walling, a recurring character in Connelly's novels.

In April 2004, The Poet was reissued in paperback with an introduction by Stephen King.

Plot 
The book starts with Jack McEvoy, a crime reporter for the Rocky Mountain News ("Death is my beat"), relating how the news of his identical twin brother Sean's suicide was broken to him.  Sean was a homicide detective with the Denver Police, who was found dead in his car in a remote parking lot.  A one-sentence suicide note was found in the car with him, and it seemed impossible that someone else could have killed him.  McEvoy, though, is reluctant to accept that his brother had succumbed to depression resulting from his investigations, even though the last one was particularly brutal: Theresa Lofton, a young college student, who was found in a park in two pieces.

After much investigation on his own, including retracing his brother's investigation into the Lofton case, Jack concludes that his brother's death was simply made to look like a suicide by a serial killer.  By focusing on homicide detectives who committed suicide in a similar fashion and left a one-sentence suicide note quoting the works of Edgar Allan Poe (as Sean's did), Jack finds three clear matches to his brother's death.  When the FBI finally realizes that he is on to something and attempts to block him from further access, he is able to trade his knowledge of the other deaths (one of which the FBI had not uncovered) for a role with the FBI investigative team headed by Robert Backus, the son of a famous agent within the bureau who has been overshadowed by his father's legend.  Assigned the duty of handling him is agent Rachel Walling, one of Backus' main protégés, and the two of them become personally involved.  The FBI nicknames the serial killer "The Poet" because of his use of Poe's lines with the victims.

As the case focuses on an Internet network of pedophiles and one in particular (William Gladden), McEvoy is taken along on the operation to arrest Gladden, who is suspicious of the set-up and kills the FBI agent trying to arrest him, Gordon Thorson (Walling's ex-husband).  McEvoy ends up killing Gladden himself while being held hostage.  However, Gladden's comments about his brother's death lead McEvoy to believe that Gladden was not the killer, even though the case has been officially closed. He then finds evidence that the killings had a connection to the FBI and identifies a phone call to the FBI from Thorson's room that he links to a "boasting" fax sent to the bureau by The Poet.  Since McEvoy knew that Walling had sent Thorson on a fake errand to buy condoms during the time the fax was sent, he suspects Walling of being The Poet and of posting to the pedophile network under the name "Eidolon", another Poe reference.  He then learns that Walling's father, a cop, had committed suicide when she was a teenager ... and had been suspected by the investigating officers of molesting Rachel over a period of time.  Since pedophiles tend to have been abused as children, McEvoy becomes worried enough to tell Backus of his suspicions.  Backus tells McEvoy that they'll set a trap for Walling and then takes him to a remote location—where Backus drugs McEvoy into nonresistance.  Backus admits that he himself is both Eidolon and The Poet, because the room mistakenly billed to Thorson was actually the one in which he stayed.  He admits to all of the deaths and to his setup of Gladden as the "fall guy" for the murders.

As Backus prepares to sodomize and then kill McEvoy, Walling (who was suspicious because of messages that she had received from both men) shows up and eventually saves McEvoy's life by knocking Backus out the window and down a long hill.  Later the police find a body; however, it is left open if this is Backus. Meanwhile, as the facts of the case become known, Walling's judgment is called into question owing to her personal relationship with McEvoy and her professional relationship with Backus.  A tabloid publishes a photo of McEvoy and Walling together.  However, because McEvoy suspected her, Walling ends their relationship and takes a trip to Italy.  McEvoy then takes leave from his paper to write a book about the events, although Walling explains to him that the book will forever taint the FBI because of Backus.

Awards and nominations
The Poet won the 1997 Anthony Award, presented by the Mystery Writers of America and the Dilys Award, presented by the Independent Mystery Booksellers Association.

References 

1996 American novels
Novels by Michael Connelly
Novels about journalists
Novels set in Denver
Nero Award-winning works
Anthony Award-winning works
Dilys Award-winning works